The 1892 Army Cadets football team represented the United States Military Academy in the 1892 college football season. In the second full season of Army football, the Cadets compiled a 3–1–1 record, shut out three of their five opponents, and outscored all opponents by a combined total of 90 to 18.  In the third annual Army–Navy Game, the Cadets lost to the Midshipmen by a 12 to 4 score.

No Army Cadets were honored on the 1892 College Football All-America Team.  Dennis Michie, who was captain of the Army football team in 1890 and 1891, was the coach of the 1892 team. Michie was killed in 1898 during the Spanish–American War. Army's home football stadium, Michie Stadium, was dedicated in his honor when it opened in 1924.

Schedule

Players
 Butler Ames, left end
 Thales L. Ames, center
 Jens Bugge
 Thomas Carson
 Elmer Clark, right guard (captain)
 George Houle, left tackle
 Edward L. King, left halfback
 Charles W. Kutz
 Albert Laws, left guard
 Harry Pattison, fullback
 William Smedberg
 Fine W. Smith, right tackle
 Lucian Stacy, right end
 Harry H. Stout, quarterback
 Edward J. Timberlake, right halfback

References

Army
Army Black Knights football seasons
Army Cadets football